Pethia guganio is a species of ray-finned fish in the genus Pethia. It is found in India and Bangladesh.

References

Pethia
Barbs (fish)
Fish described in 1822
Taxa named by Francis Buchanan-Hamilton